Statistics of Úrvalsdeild in the 1956 season.

Overview 
It was contested by 6 teams, and Valur won the championship. KR's Sigurður Bergsson and ÍA's Þórður Þórðarson were the joint top scorers with 6 goals.

League standings

Results

References 

Úrvalsdeild karla (football) seasons
Iceland
Iceland
Urvalsdeild